Spinzizzle is an iOS game developed by American studio PressOK Entertainment and released on May 21, 2010.

Reception
The game has received "generally favorable reviews" on Metacritic, garnering a score of 84% based on 6 critic reviews.

SlideToPlay said " The name's pretty silly, but underneath it is an incredibly good Match-3 game. " AppSpy wrote " Spinzizzle is a great addition to anyone's casual collection of three-match puzzlers, with its slick presentation and broadly appealing simple gameplay. " GamePro said " It has a terrible name, but Spinzizzle is a surprisingly fun game. " PocketGamerUK wrote " While the prospect of matching three of more balls isn't going to win any awards, Spinzizzle is delightfully original and represents an interesting, highly playable spin on the genre. " IGN said " Spinzizzle is a cool riff on the established formula that will keep you hooked for days. " TouchArcade wrote " I've been having a lot of fun with Spinzizzle, largely in part because it's often entirely possible to clear the entire game board at once, and figuring out how to do that is a really good time if you're a puzzle game perfectionist. "

References

2010 video games
Android (operating system) games
IOS games
Tile-matching video games
Video games developed in the United States